Sepsis is a genus of flies in the family Sepsidae.

Species
S. barbata Becker, 1907
S. biflexuosa Strobl, 1893
S. cynipsea (Linnaeus, 1758)
S. duplicata Haliday, 1838
S. fissa Becker, 1903
S. flavimana Meigen, 1826
S. fulgens Meigen, 1826
S. geniculata Bigot, 1891
S. lateralis Wiedemann, 1830
S. luteipes Melander & Spuler, 1917
S. macrochaetophora Duda, 1926
S. neglecta Ozerov, 1986
S. neocynipsea Melander & Spuler, 1917
S. nigripes Meigen, 1826
S. niveipennis Becker, 1903
S. orthocnemis Frey, 1908
S. pseudomonostigma Urso, 1969
S. punctum (Fabricius, 1794)
S. pyrrhosoma Melander & Spuler 1917
S. setulosa (Duda, 1926)
S. spura Ang & Meier, 2010
S. thoracica (Robineau-Desvoidy, 1830)
S. violacea Meigen, 1826
S. zuskai Iwasa, 1982

See also
List of sepsid fly species recorded in Europe

References

Sepsidae
Diptera of Europe
Brachycera genera
Taxa named by Carl Fredrik Fallén